Pauline van Dongen (born 1986) is a Dutch fashion designer specialised in wearable technology.

Life
In 2010, van Dongen established her own design studio, Pauline van Dongen Studio. The studio, located in Arnhem (the Netherlands) has collaborated with several high-profile companies such as the electronics giant Philips, to create light-up sportswear. By collaborating with technology companies, Pauline van Dongen Studio aims to use technology to add value to fashion.

Pauline van Dongen was listed in the Forbes list of Europe's Top 50 Women in Tech 2018.

In 2022, she founded the Solar Biennale at the Het Nieuwe Instituut with Dutch solar designer Marjan van Aubel.

References 

1986 births
Living people
Dutch fashion designers
Dutch women fashion designers
Businesspeople from Amsterdam
Designers from Amsterdam